Ralph Jackson (born 1962) is an American former basketball player.

Ralph Jackson may also refer to:
 Ralph Jackson (martyr) (died 1556), one of the Stratford Martyrs
 Ralph Jackson (priest) (died 1559), English priest
 Ralph Ward Jackson (1806–1880), politician
 Ralph Jackson (Manitoba politician), Independent candidate in the 1995 Manitoba provincial election